Handala, also Handhala, Hanzala or Hanthala, is a prominent national symbol and  personification of the Palestinian people.

The character was created in 1969 by  political cartoonist Naji al-Ali, and first took its current form in 1973. Handala became the signature of Naji al-Ali's cartoons and remains an iconic symbol of Palestinian identity and defiance. The character has been described as "portraying war, resistance, and the Palestinian identity with astounding clarity".

The name comes from Citrullus colocynthis, a perennial plant local to the region of Palestine which bears a bitter fruit, grows back when cut and has deep roots.

Handala's impact has continued in the decades after al-Ali's 1987 assassination; today the character remains widely popular as a representative of the Palestinian people, and is found on numerous walls and buildings throughout the West Bank (notably as West Bank Wall graffiti art), Gaza and other Palestinian refugee camps, and as a popular tattoo and jewellery motif. It has also been used by movements such as Boycott, Divestment and Sanctions and the Iranian Green Movement.

Early publication
Handala appeared for the first time in Al-Seyassah in Kuwait on 13 July 1969, and first turned his back to the viewer and clasped his hands behind his back from 1973 onwards.

Symbolism
Handala's age – ten years old – represents Naji al-Ali's age in 1948 when he was forced to leave Palestine and would not grow up until he could return to his homeland: Al-Ali wrote that:
Handala was born 10 years old and he will always be 10 years old. It was at that age that I left my homeland. When Handala returns, he will still be 10 years old, and then he will start growing up.

His posture, with his turned back and clasped hands symbolise the character's "rejection at a time when solutions are presented to us the American way" and as "a symbol of rejection of all the present negative tides in our region."

Handala's ragged clothes and standing barefoot symbolise his allegiance to the poor.

Al-Ali described Handala as "the symbol of a just cause":
He was the arrow of the compass, pointing steadily towards Palestine. Not just Palestine in geographical terms, but Palestine in its humanitarian sense—the symbol of a just cause, whether it is located in Egypt, Vietnam or South Africa.

Legacy

Al-Ali stated in an interview prior to his assassination that: "Handala, whom I created, will not end after I die. I hope that this is not an exaggeration when I say that I will continue to live in Handala, even after I die". Current usages of the Handala motif include:
 Graffiti on numerous walls, buildings and souvenir shops throughout the West Bank (notably West Bank Wall graffiti art), Gaza and other Palestinian refugee camps
 A primary symbol of the Boycott, Divestment and Sanctions movement
 A popular tattoo and jewellery motif
 The web mascot of the Iranian green movement 
 In Israeli artwork, particular alongside the Israeli character Srulik

Gallery

See also
 Culture of Palestine
 List of national symbols of Palestine

Bibliography

References

National personifications
Palestinian culture
National symbols of the State of Palestine
History of the Palestinian refugees
Fictional characters introduced in 1969